Isochore may refer to:

 Isochoric process, in thermodynamics
 Isochore (genetics)
 Isochore map, in geology

 

Isochore, in chemistry as a line representing the variation of pressure with temperature when the volume of the substance operated on is constant. See Isochoric process